The 1988 UEFA European Football Championship final tournament was held in West Germany from 10 to 25 June 1988. It was the eighth UEFA European Championship, which is held every four years and supported by UEFA.

The tournament crowned the Netherlands as European champions for the first time. Euro 88 was a rare instance of a major football tournament ending without a single sending-off or goalless draw, nor any knockout matches going to extra time or penalties. Euro 1988 was the final European Championship to see West Germany and the Soviet Union teams, as the West and East Germans reunified to become Germany in 1990, the Soviet Union disintegrated into 15 separate countries in 1991.

Bid process
West Germany won the right to host the tournament with five votes ahead of a joint bid from Norway, Sweden and Denmark, which earned one vote, and a bid from England.

Because the Eastern Bloc disagreed that West Berlin was part of the Federal Republic of Germany, the German Football Association ruled out playing Championship matches in West Berlin. This secured the participation of Eastern European members of UEFA. In the 1974 FIFA World Cup, however, West Berlin had hosted three games.

As a compromise, Berlin Olympic Stadium did host a Four Nations Tournament in 1988, with West Germany playing against the Soviet Union, Argentina and Sweden.

Overview

Group matches
The first group pitted two pre-tournament favourites West Germany and Italy together, along with Spain and Denmark. The West German team had won the 1980 European Championship and were the runners-up in each of the last two World Cups in 1982 and 1986, although in 1984 they failed to qualify from their group. With such results and additionally as the host they were commonly considered the main favourite of the tournament.

The Italians had not played at Euro 1984, though they had finished fourth in the 1980 tournament, for which they were the hosts; they had also won the 1982 World Cup, albeit followed by a middling performance in 1986. Spain and Denmark contested the second semi-final of the 1984 edition, which Spain prevailed on penalty-kicks, but then lost the final to hosts, France (who failed to qualify in 1988). Both Spain and Denmark played in the 1986 World Cup, and met there again, in a Round of 16 match of the knockout stage which Spain won 5–1.

The Germans and Italians played out the opening game. This game was tightly contested. Roberto Mancini capitalised on a defensive error on the left-hand side of the German goal and the striker squeezed in a shot from a tight angle low to the left corner. Just three minutes later, Italy's goalkeeper, Walter Zenga was penalised for taking more than four steps with the ball and Andreas Brehme scored the resulting free-kick from the edge of the penalty area with a low shot to the right corner. Both teams settled for a 1–1 draw.

Spain defeated Denmark again, this time 3–2. Míchel opened the scoring after five minutes with a shot to the left corner from inside the penalty area and Michael Laudrup equalised 20 minutes later with a left foot shot from the edge of the penalty area to the left corner. Spain dominated the next hour and Emilio Butragueño scored with a low shot through the goalkeepers legs and then Rafael Gordillo putting the Spanish 3–1 to the good with a free-kick which deceived the goalkeeper. A late surge saw Flemming Povlsen reduce the scoreline with a header in off the left post, but was not enough for the Danes, who now needed to win both their remaining games to be certain of a place in the semi-finals.

In the remaining games the West Germans swept aside the Danes and Spanish. Jürgen Klinsmann and Olaf Thon scored to dispatch the former 2–0 while two goals from Rudi Völler were enough to beat Spain 2–0. The second goal was particularly notable. Lothar Matthäus ran 40 yards into the Spanish penalty box before back-heeling the ball for the oncoming Völler, following up his run, to strike the ball with the outside of his foot and into the corner of the goal.

The Italians won a difficult match against the Spanish 1–0, courtesy of a goal from Gianluca Vialli, a low cross-shot to the net on 73 minutes. In the last game, against an already eliminated Denmark, the Italians prevailed 2–0.

The second group witnessed a surprising set of results. In the opening game, one of the pre-tournament favourites England lost 1–0 to Ireland. Ray Houghton scored a looping header after six minutes after the English defence failed to clear a cross. The English applied strong pressure as the game wore on. Gary Lineker was unusually sluggish, missing a series of chances and hitting the crossbar – he was later diagnosed with hepatitis B. In the other opening game, the Soviet Union defeated the Netherlands 1–0 through a Vasyl Rats goal, despite the Dutch dominating for long periods.

England met the Netherlands in Düsseldorf; both needed to win. England started strongly with Lineker hitting a post and Glenn Hoddle striking the post with a free-kick. The English defence, weakened by the absence of Terry Butcher, conceded the first of three goals to Marco van Basten on 44 minutes. Van Basten turned Butcher's replacement Tony Adams and beat Peter Shilton – playing his 100th game for England – to give his side a 1–0 lead. England rallied after the break. Lineker and Bryan Robson exchanged a kick one-two pass allowing Robson to burst into the box and lift the ball over Hans van Breukelen after 53 minutes. The score remained until Van Basten turned Tony Adams inside out to finish from 18 yards on 71 minutes. The striker pounced from close-range after a corner to seal a 3–1 win four minutes later.

The Irish and Soviets led the group after two games through a 1–1 draw in Hanover. Ronnie Whelan scored a spectacular left-foot volley from 18 yards to put the Irish into the lead. Oleh Protasov equalised with a low shot as the Soviets exerted late pressure.

Needing to defeat the Irish to progress, the Dutch won the game 1–0 through a late Wim Kieft goal. The ball deflected into his path and he delivered a looping header which spun into the right corner of the Irish net with nine minutes remaining just after Paul McGrath hit a Dutch post with a header. In the other game, the Soviets soundly thrashed England. A mistake from Hoddle allowed Sergei Aleinikov to score after three minutes. Adams equalised and England had chances to go ahead, but a goal before half-time and late in the game assured the Soviet Union would finish in first place in the group.

Semi-finals and final
The first semi-final was significant as rivals West Germany played the Netherlands. It was only the third time the two sides had faced each other since the 1974 FIFA World Cup Final; the West Germans winning a first round match in the 1980 European Championship, and a 2–2 draw in a 1978 FIFA World Cup second round group match. The game was tight, and the West Germans broke the deadlock on 55 minutes with a Matthäus penalty after a foul on Klinsmann. The lead was held for 20 minutes until Jürgen Kohler brought down Van Basten. Ronald Koeman converted the spot-kick to level the match. With the match headed for extra time, a through ball caught the Germans out and Van Basten finished clinically with a shot as he slid along the floor, beating the goalkeeper and Kohler to the ball in the 88th minute for a 2–1 win. It gave the Dutch their first competitive victory against the Germans and the first appearance in the competition's final. The victory was marred by the reaction of Dutch defender Koeman who wiped the shirt of Olaf Thon, given to him after the match, on his backside in front of the German fans. The player apologised afterwards.

The other semi-final was another unpredictable result. Italy were strong favourites to reach the final and had beaten the Soviets 4–1 in a friendly just two months earlier. Despite controlling the play and having the majority of the chances, the Italians were undone by poor finishing and a strong, tough opposition who sought to stop their more skilful opponents from playing through hard tackles and a defensive strategy. The hard work-rate of the Soviets paid off and in just four second-half minutes, counter-attacks saw two goals from Hennadiy Lytovchenko and Oleg Protasov. The first one from Lytovchenko was initially blocked, but with quick reactions he beat Franco Baresi to the ball to fire the second shot into the far corner. The second from Protasov was a looping shot that floated over Zenga for a 2–0 victory. It would be the Soviet Union's fourth appearance in a European Championship final.

The final was played on 25 June between the Soviet Union, in what would turn out to be the nation's last European Championship match, and the Netherlands at the Olympiastadion in Munich. The Dutch won the match 2–0, with goals by captain Ruud Gullit and tournament top scorer Marco van Basten. Hans van Breukelen blocked a low penalty shot of Igor Belanov. Van Basten's goal, a sharply hit volley across the goal off an incoming looping pass, would later be described as one of the greatest goals in the history of the European Championships.

Qualification

Qualified teams
Seven countries had to qualify for the final stage. West Germany qualified automatically as hosts of the event. The Republic of Ireland qualified for the first time for any major tournament. The holders, France, failed to qualify. As of 2020, this is the last time that France failed to qualify for the European Championship finals. Other notable absentees were Belgium (the 1980 runners-up and 1986 FIFA World Cup semi-finalists) and Portugal (semi-finalists of Euro 1984). The following eight teams qualified for the final tournament:

Venues

Squads

Each national team had to submit a squad of 20 players.

Match officials

Fourth officials

Group stage

The teams finishing in the top two of each group progressed to the semi-finals.

All times are local, CEST (UTC+2).

Tiebreakers
If two or more teams finished level on points after completion of the group matches, the following tie-breakers were used to determine the final ranking:
 Greater number of points in all group matches
 Goal difference in all group matches
 Greater number of goals scored in all group matches
 Drawing of lots

Group 1

Group 2

Knockout stage

In the knockout phase, extra time would be played if scores were level after 90 minutes, and a penalty shoot-out if teams could not be separated after the additional period.

Bracket

Semi-finals

Final

Statistics

Goalscorers

Awards
UEFA Team of the Tournament

References

External links

 

 
1988
1987–88 in European football
1987–88 in West German football
1988
June 1988 sports events in Europe